The 38th Infantry Division "Puglie" was a infantry division of the Royal Italian Army during World War II. The Puglie was classified as a mountain infantry division, which meant that the division's artillery was moved by pack mules instead of the horse-drawn carriages of line infantry divisions. Italy's real mountain warfare divisions were the six alpine divisions manned by Alpini mountain troops. 

The division was raised on 15 May 1939 and named for the Southern Italian region of Apulia. The division mostly drafted men from eastern Veneto and the Friuli region, with a majority of soldiers hailing from the towns of Sacile and Vittorio Veneto. The Puglie was disbanded by Germans forces the Armistice of Cassibile between Italy and the Allies was announced on 8 September 1943.

History 
The division's lineage begins with the Brigade "Puglie" established in Milan on 1 August 1862 with the 71st and 72nd infantry regiments.

World War I 
The brigade fought on the Italian front in World War I. In fall 1926 the 72nd Infantry Regiment "Puglie" was disbanded, while Brigade "Puglie" was renamed X Infantry Brigade. On 15 May 1939 the 72nd Infantry Regiment "Puglie" was reactivated and the command of the 38th Infantry Division "Puglie" was raised. On the same date the division received the 71st Infantry Regiment "Puglie" from the 10th Infantry Division "Piave" and the 15th Artillery Regiment from the 13th Infantry Division "Re".

World War II 

In February 1941 the division was sent to Albania to reinforce the Italian front in the Greco-Italian War. On 5 March the Puglie entered the front at Dishnicë. From 9 March 1941 the Puglie division tried to take Monastery Hill near the hamlet of Komarak, as part of the failed Italian Spring Offensive. By 11 March 1941 the division had suffered so many casualties that it was removed from the front line and sent to the rear to be rebuilt.

On 1 April 1941 the Puglie was transferred to the Albanian-Yugoslav border for the upcoming Invasion of Yugoslavia. The Puglie took up positions in the Kukës – Fushë-Muhurr – Qafë-Murrë area. On 7 April 1941 the division defeated Yugoslav attacks at Blatë and on 9 April at Maqellarë. On 11 April the division crossed the border and entered Kosovo, where it captured Debar. On the same day the Puglie met up with German forces entering Kosovo from the north. On 27–28 April 1941 the Puglie occupied Prizren, Peć and Gjakova. On 1 May 1941 additional garrisons were established at Orahovac, Štimlje and Skenderaj and the division's headquarter established itself in Prizren. The Puglie remained in Kosovo on anti-partisan duty for the rest of the war.

After the announcement of the Armistice of Cassibile on 8 September 1943 the Puglie retreated to Albania, where it was disbanded by invading German forces.

Organization 
  9th Infantry Division "Puglie", in Conegliano
 71st Infantry Regiment "Puglie", in Sacile
 Command Company
 3x Fusilier battalions
 Support Weapons Company (65/17 infantry support guns)
 Mortar Company (81mm Mod. 35 mortars)
 72nd Infantry Regiment "Puglie", in Vittorio Veneto
 Command Company
 3x Fusilier battalions
 Support Weapons Company (65/17 infantry support guns)
 Mortar Company (81mm Mod. 35 mortars)
 15th Artillery Regiment "Puglie", in Conegliano
 Command Unit
 I Group (100/17 howitzers)
 II Group (75/27 field guns)
 III Group (75/27 field guns)
 1x Anti-aircraft battery (20/65 Mod. 35 anti-aircraft guns)
 Ammunition and Supply Unit
 XXXVIII Mortar Battalion (81mm Mod. 35 mortars)
 38th Anti-tank Company (47/32 anti-tank guns)
 38th Telegraph and Radio Operators Company
 43rd Engineer Company
 56th Medical Section
 56th Supply Section
 38th Transport Section
 38th Bakers Section
 71st Carabinieri Section
 12th Field Post Office

Attached to the division from the end of 1940 to early 1942:
 115th CC.NN. Legion "Del Cimino"
 CXV CC.NN. Battalion (remained attached to the division until September 1943)
 CXXI CC.NN. Battalion
 115th CC.NN. Machine Gun Company

Attached to the division in 1943:
 1st Regiment "Cacciatori d'Albania"
 Battalion "Gramos"
 Battalion "Korata"
 Machine Gun Company
 Support Weapons Company (47/32 anti-tank guns)

Commanding officers 
The division's commanding officers were:

 Generale di Brigata Francesco Zani (15 May 1939 - 31 August 1939)
 Generale di Divisione Mario Marghinotti (1 September 1939 - 1 November 1940)
 Generale di Divisione Alberto d'Aponte (2 November 1940 - 30 April 1942)
 Colonel Gino Reghini (acting, 1-11 May 1942)
 Generale di Divisione Federico d'Arle (12 May 1942 - 1 September 1943)
 Generale di Brigata Luigi Clerico (2-9 September 1943)

References 

 

Infantry divisions of Italy in World War II
Military units and formations of Italy in Yugoslavia in World War II
Italian military units and formations of the Greco-Italian War
Military units and formations established in 1939
Military units and formations disestablished in 1943